Dipodinae is a subfamily of Dipodidae.

Classification
Subfamily Dipodinae
Tribe Dipodini
Genus Dipus
Northern three-toed jerboa, Dipus sagitta
Genus Eremodipus
Lichtenstein's jerboa, Eremodipus lichtensteini
Genus Jaculus
Blanford's jerboa, Jaculus blanfordi
Lesser Egyptian jerboa, Jaculus jaculus
Greater Egyptian jerboa, Jaculus orientalis
Thaler's jerboa, Jaculus thaleri
Genus Stylodipus, three-toed Jerboas
Andrews's three-toed jerboa, Stylodipus andrewsi
Mongolian three-toed jerboa, Stylodipus sungorus
Thick-tailed three-toed jerboa, Stylodipus telum
Tribe Paradipodini
Genus Paradipus
Comb-toed jerboa, Paradipus ctenodactylus

Notes

Dipodidae
Taxa named by Gotthelf Fischer von Waldheim
Mammal subfamilies